Henry III ( – 21 June 1221) was the Duke of Limburg and Count of Arlon from 1165 to his death. He was the son and successor of Henry II and Matilda of Saffenberg.

In 1172, he fought against the Count of Luxembourg, Henry IV the Blind, and then his ally, the Count of Hainaut, Baldwin V. The environs of Arlon were devastated and the duke, overcome, had to recompense the Count of Luxembourg for the wrongs he had done him. In 1183, he supported the election of Folmar of Karden as Archbishop of Trier. This was opposed by the emperor, Frederick Barbarossa.

In 1213, Henry faced his nephew Henry I, Duke of Brabant at the battle of Steppes. The Duke of Brabant's army broke and ran. Henry later supported Otto of Brunswick over Philip of Swabia as German king and imperial claimant. He fought at the Battle of Bouvines in 1214 for Otto of Brunswick, while his son Waleran sided with Philip II of France.

He married Sophia of Saarbrücken, daughter of Simon I, Count of Saarbrücken. Their son, Waleran III, succeeded him as Duke of Limburg.

References

Sources

1140 births
1221 deaths
Year of birth uncertain

Dukes of Limburg
Counts of Arlon
Christians of the Third Crusade